A chainplate is a metal plate used to fasten a shroud or stay to the hull of a sailboat.  One end of the chainplate is normally fastened to a turnbuckle which is connected to the shroud or stay, whereas the remainder of the chainplate normally has multiple holes that are bolted to the hull.  This distributes the load across the hull, making it possible for a somewhat lighter hull to support the load of the shrouds and stays.

References 

Sailing rigs and rigging
Nautical terminology